Umberto Scotti, a striker born in Ticino Oriano on January 27, 1885, was one of the first players to play for Italian side A.C. Milan; he cut off his career short after a loss to Juventus F.C.

External links
 http://www.magliarossonera.it/protagonisti/Gioc-Scotti.html

A.C. Milan players
1885 births
Year of death unknown
Italian footballers
Association football forwards